Vilémov is a municipality and village in Děčín District in the Ústí nad Labem Region of the Czech Republic. It has about 900 inhabitants.

Administrative parts
The village of Dolina is an administrative part of Vilémov.

Sport
Vilémov is home to a football club SK Stap Tratec Vilémov, which plays in the lower amateur tiers.

References

Villages in Děčín District